Phra Samut Chedi is the westernmost district (amphoe) of Samut Prakan province in central Thailand.

Geography
Neighboring districts are (from the west, clockwise) Bang Khun Thian and Thung Khru of Bangkok, Phra Pradaeng and (across the Chao Phraya River) Mueang Samut Prakan of Samut Prakan Province.

History
The district was created as a minor district (king amphoe) on 15 December 1984 by splitting off five tambons from Mueang district. It was upgraded to a full district on 15 July 1991.

Administration
The district is divided into five sub-districts (tambons), which are further subdivided into 42 villages (mubans). There are two townships (thesaban tambons): Phra Samut Chedi covers tambon Pak Klong Bang Pla Kot, and Lae Fa Pha covers parts of tambons Laem Fa Pha and Nai Khlong Bang Pla Kot. There are a further four tambon administrative organizations (TAO), for each tambon except Pak Klong Bang Pla Kot, which has no non-municipal area.

Environment
The district's coastline has seen severe erosion since the 1990s. Coastal mangrove forests were destroyed then and replaced with shrimp farms. Three to five metres of shoreline has been submerged every year since then, resulting in the loss of 4,000 rai of land to the sea. 

Thailand lost almost one third of its coastal mangrove forests between 1961 and 2000.  According to Thailand's Department of Marine and Coastal Resources, a quarter of the country's shores—about 700 kilometres (500 miles)—are eroding, some "severely".

Places

The district is named after the temple Phra Samut Chedi, which was built 1827–1828 by King Buddha Loetla Nabhalai (Rama II) on an island in the Chao Phraya River—hence its popular name Phra Chedi Klang Nam ('chedi in the middle of the water'). The island is now connected with the left river bank.

At the mouth of the Chao Phraya is Chulachomklao Fort, built in 1819 and came into use only once during the Paknam crisis in the same year. The fort is now accessible to visitors. The HTMS Maeklong, a former training ship of the Royal Thai Navy, is another attraction in the park.

References

External links
amphoe.com

Phra Samut Chedi
1984 establishments in Thailand